Krominskaya is a rural locality (a village) in Oshevenskoye Rural Settlement of Kargopolsky District, Arkhangelsk Oblast, Russia. The population was 8 as of 2010.

Geography 
Krominskaya is located 35 km north of Kargopol (the district's administrative centre) by road. Pogost Navolochny is the nearest rural locality.

References 

Rural localities in Kargopolsky District